Pagurus proximus is a species of hermit crab within the family Paguridae. Occurrences of the species have been made from China, South Korea, and Japan, with the holotype of the species being from Miyako Bay.

References 

Crustaceans described in 2000
Hermit crabs
Arthropods of Korea
Crustaceans of Japan
Arthropods of China
Crustaceans of the Pacific Ocean